Cnaphalocrocis sanitalis is a moth in the family Crambidae. It was described by Snellen in 1880. It is found on Sumatra.

References

Moths described in 1880
Spilomelinae